Laurence Sterne was an Anglican clergyman.  In that position he delivered many sermons. Early in his career, he decided to publish his sermons. At first, only two were published. Sterne later parodied sermon writing in his novel, The Life and Opinions of Tristram Shandy, Gentleman along with adding semi-serious sermons directly into the text. Throughout his career, Sterne continued to preach and collect his own sermons.  

There are 45 recorded sermons, 3 of which are extensions of a previously-discussed topic. Two editions of his sermons were published during his life, and these works outsold all his other works and were the source for much of his fame. These editions were published under Sterne's pseudonym, "Mr. Yorick".

Background

Notable Sermons

Case of Hezekiah and the Messengers
On 25 March 1764, Sterne delivered a sermon in Paris that was important to Anglo-French relations. The sermon was first printed in Sermons of Mr Yorick Vol. III (1766) with edits and changes to various parts of the text, but was mis-attributed as having been delivered in 1763. This sermon was not notable for its content per se, but for its being given on the opening of the English embassy in Paris at the end of the Seven Years' War. 

The opening of the sermon, a summation of 2 Kings 20:13-17, surprised and shocked many guests, because the passage was viewed as an insult to the embassy's hosts, Lord and Lady Hertford. However, Lord Hertford reacted kindly and thanked Sterne for the sermon. Laurence later rewrote passages of the sermon.

The sermon was written in order to appeal to an audience of mixed religious beliefs. Those like David Hume and Diderot were in attendance, and Sterne had joked that the sermon would convert the French from "deism to Shandeism". Regardless, the basis of the sermon was to promote the idea that humans are basically good.

Sermons

According to the 1851 collection of sermons, the complete existing sermons are:
"Inquiry after Happiness"
"The House of Feasting and the House of Mourning considered"
"Philanthropy Recommended"
"Self-Knowledge"
"Elijah and the Widow of Zarephath"
"Pharisee and Publican in the Temple"
"Vindication of Human Nature"
"Time and Chance"
"The Character of Herod"
"The Shortness and Troubles of Life"
"Evil-Speaking"
"Joseph's History considered; - Forgiveness of Injuries"
"Duty of setting Bounds to our Desires"
"Self-Examination"
"Job's Expostulation with his wife"
"The Character of Shimei"
"Case of Hezekiah and the Messengers"
"The Levite and his Concubine"
"Felix's Behavior towards Paul"
"The Prodigal Son"
"National Mercies considered"
"The History of Jacob considered"
"Parable of the Rich Man and Lazarus"
"Pride"
"Humility"
"Advantages of Christianity to the world"
"The Abuses of Conscience considered"
"Temporal advantages of Religion"
"Our Conversation in Heaven"
"Description of the World"
"St. Peter's Character"
"Thirtieth of January"
 - the above continued
"Trust in God"
 - the above continued
"Sanctity of the Apostles"
"Penances"
"On Enthusiasm"
"Eternal Advantages of Religion"
"Asa. - A Thanksgiving Sermon"
"Follow Peace"
"Search the Scriptures"
 - the above continued
"The Ways of Providence justified unto Man"
"The Ingratitude of Israel"

Composition
Each of the sermons begins with a scripture quotation that deals with the theme of the sermon.

Reception
Thomas Gray wrote: "Have you read his 'Sermons,' with his own comic figure, from a painting by Reynolds, at the head of them? They are in the style I think most proper for the pulpit, and show a strong imagination and a sensible heart; but you see him often tottering on the verge of laughter, and ready to throw his periwig in the face of the audience." 22 June 1760

William Makepeace Thackeray claimed that Sterne, as a writer of comedy and sermons, was "more than rival of the Dean of St. Patrick's", referring to Jonathan Swift.

References

 Hamilton Harlan W. "Sterne's Sermon in Paris and Its Background" Proceedings of the American Philosophical Society, Vol. 128, No. 4 (Dec., 1984), pp. 316–325

External links
 Text of "The Case of Hezekiah and the Messengers" sermon
 Laurence Sterne's Sermons Available as Digital Books

Christian sermons
18th-century speeches